The 19th Central Commission for Discipline Inspection (19th CCDI) of the Chinese Communist Party (CCP) was elected by the CCP's 19th National Congress on 24 October 2017, and its turn lasts until the convocation of the 20th National Congress in 2022. The CCDI is composed of 133 members. A member has voting rights. To be elected to the CCDI, a candidate must be a party member for at least five years.

The 1st Plenary Session in 2017 was responsible for electing the bodies in which the authority of the Central Commission for Discipline Inspection was invested when it was not in session: the 19th Standing Committee. It was also responsible for electing the CCDI Secretary.

Keys

Members

References

Citations

Sources 

 General
Plenary sessions, apparatus heads, ethnicity, the Central Commission for Discipline Inspection membership, Politburo membership, Secretariat membership, Central Military Commission members, Standing Committee of the Central Committee membership, offices an individual held, retirement, if the individual in question is military personnel, female, has been expelled, is currently under investigation or has retired:
 
 
 
  Note: For information on individual members (such as work history, birthdate, or ethnicity), press on their names (which will lead you to a page devoted to that specific individual).
   Note: ''For information on individual members (such as work history, birthdate, or ethnicity), search their name (in Chinese) and you will be transported directly to a page devoted to them.

Central Commission for Discipline Inspection
2017 establishments in China